A court of cassation is a high-instance court that exists in some judicial systems.  Courts of cassation do not re-examine the facts of a case, they only interpret the relevant law. In this they are appellate courts of the highest instance. In this way they differ from systems which have a supreme court which can rule on both the facts of a case and the relevant law. The term derives from the Latin , "to reverse or overturn".

The European Court of Justice answers questions of European Union law following a referral from a court of a member state. In exercising this function it is not a court of cassation: it issues binding advice to the national courts on how EU law ought to be interpreted, it does not overturn decisions of those courts. However, the Court of Justice can act as a court of cassation when it hears appeals from the General Court of the European Union.

Many common-law supreme courts, like the United States Supreme Court, use a similar system, whereby the court vacates the decision of the lower court and remands the case for retrial in a lower court consistent with the decision of the supreme court. Where the system differs is that in legal systems such as the American federal courts, mid-tier appeals courts (courts of appeals) generally also remand cases to first-instance courts. In contrast, in France, for instance, courts of appeal hear cases on the facts and the law also, and only in the higher court of cassation is examination confined to matters of law.

Countries
Cassation courts are listed below.

 Court of Cassation of Austria
 Supreme Court  of the Republic of Azerbaijan
 Court of Cassation (Belgium)
 Court of Cassation (Armenia)
 Supreme Court of Cassation of Bulgaria
 Court of Cassation (Democratic Republic of the Congo)
 Corte Nacional de Justicia (Ecuador)
 Court of Cassation (Egypt)
 Supreme Court of Estonia
 Court of Cassation (France)
 Court of Cassation (Greece)
 In Germany:
 the Federal Court of Justice, 
 the Federal Administrative Court, 
 the Federal Labour Court, 
 the Federal Social Court, 
 and the Federal Fiscal Court
 Court of Cassation (Haiti)
 Court of Final Appeal (Hong Kong)
 Supreme Court of Indonesia (Indonesia)
 Court of Cassation (Iraq)
 Supreme Court of Cassation (Italy)
 Supreme Court of Japan
 Court of Cassation (Jordan)
 Supreme Court of Korea (South Korea)
 Court of Cassation (Kuwait)
 Court of Cassation (Lebanon) 
 Supreme Court of Lithuania
 Court of Cassation (Luxembourg)
 Court of Cassation (Morocco)
 Supreme Court of the Netherlands
 Supreme Court of Poland
 Court of Cassation (Qatar)
 High Court of Cassation and Justice (Romania)
 Court of Cassation (Senegal)
 Supreme Court of Cassation of Serbia
 Supreme Court of Spain
 Court of Cassation (Sudan)
 Supreme Court of the Republic of China (Taiwan)
 Court of Cassation (Tunisia)
 Court of Cassation (Turkey)
 Supreme Specialized Court of Ukraine for Civil and Criminal Cases (Ukraine)
 Court of Cassation (Vatican City)

See also 

 Vacation and remand, similar doctrines in common-law countries, such as the United States.

References

Courts by type
Civil law (legal system)